In enzymology, a trans-feruloyl-CoA hydratase is an enzyme that catalyzes the chemical reaction

4-hydroxy-3-methoxyphenyl-beta-hydroxypropanoyl-CoA  trans-feruloyl-CoA + H2O

Hence, this enzyme has one substrate, 4-hydroxy-3-methoxyphenyl-beta-hydroxypropanoyl-CoA, and two products, trans-feruloyl-CoA and H2O.

This enzyme belongs to the family of lyases, specifically the hydro-lyases, which cleave carbon-oxygen bonds.  The systematic name of this enzyme class is 4-hydroxy-3-methoxyphenyl-beta-hydroxypropanoyl-CoA hydro-lyase (trans-feruloyl-CoA-forming). This enzyme is also called trans-feruloyl-CoA hydro-lyase (incorrect).

Structural studies

As of late 2007, only one structure has been solved for this class of enzymes, with the PDB accession code .

References

 
 

EC 4.2.1
Enzymes of known structure